McMurrin is a surname, and may refer to:

Joseph W. McMurrin (1858–1932), general authority and a member of the First Council of the Seventy of The Church of Jesus Christ of Latter-day Saints
Roger McMurrin (born 1939), American conductor and pastor
Sterling M. McMurrin (1914–1966), American Mormon theologian and philosophy professor